In pre-Islamic Arabia, a variety of different marriage practices existed. The most common and recognized types of marriage at this time consisted of: marriage by agreement, marriage by capture, marriage by mahr, marriage by inheritance and Mutah or temporary marriage.

Marriage by agreement
The reason for intertribal marriages was to ensure the protection and possession of the children the couple would produce. Women in some intertribal marriages had more freedom and retained the right to dismiss or divorce their husbands at any time. The women had precise rituals they used to inform their husbands of their dismissal, such as this: "if they lived in a tent they turned it around, so that if the door faced east, it now faced west, and when the man saw this, he knew that he was dismissed and did not enter".

Marriage by Mahr
Marriage by Mahr was the standard marriage practice. These marriages consisted of the groom or groom's father paying the bride an amount, indicating that he's capable of supporting her financially after the marriage. "Mahr", to marry them. Mahr is very important in Islamic marriage. Allah has used the word "faridah" for it. It means something fixed, decided and obligatory.

Marriage by capture
Marriage by capture, often taking place during times of war, marriage by capture occurred when women were taken captive by men from other tribes and placed on the slave market of Mecca. From the slave market these women were sold into marriage or slavery. In captive marriages men bought their wives and therefore had complete control over them. Women in these marriages had no freedom and were subjected to following their husband's orders and bearing his children. These women became their husbands' property and had no right to divorce.

Beena
Beena is a form of marriage used in pre-Islamic Arabia, in which a wife would own a tent of her own, within which she retained complete independence from her husband, according to William Robertson Smith. The term was suggested by John Ferguson McLennan, who noted that in Ceylon (now Sri Lanka) the marriage when a husband goes to live in the wife's village is called "beena marriage", and suggested "beena" as a general term for this kind of marriage.

Notes

References
William Robertson Smith, Kinship and Marriage in early Arabia, (1885)

 

Ethnography
Arabia
Women in pre-Islamic Arabia
Arabia